Chris Westdal (born September 13, 1947) is a former Canadian ambassador.

Early life and education
Born in Stan River Valley, Manitoba, he obtained a bachelor's degree in political science from St. John's College in Winnipeg.

Career
He is a former Ambassador to Ireland having served from September 2006 to December 2006, and Russia, between the years 2003–2006.; Mr. Westdal served as Canadian Ambassador to the United Nations in Geneva from 1999 to 2003; He was the ambassador to Ukraine from January 1996 to August 1998.; South Africa from 1991 to 1993 and Bangladesh & Burma from 1982 to 1985. Mr. Westdal's assignments abroad included India and Nepal from 1973 to 1975, responsible for Canadian International Development Agency ("CIDA") programming and Tanzania from 1970 to 1973.

Westdal is a member of the Canada Eurasia Russia Business Association (CERBA). He was the board chair of Silver Bear, a Russian Mining company, until he resigned due to the 2022 Russian invasion of Ukraine.

Controversy
He is noted for having defended the reputation of Vladimir Putin until this point - notably before the media and several parliamentary committees. He is quoted as having previously referred to Putin as one of the "finest leaders Russia’s had in centuries".

References

Living people
Ambassadors of Canada to Russia
Ambassadors of Canada to Ukraine
Ambassadors of Canada to Ireland
1947 births